The Jolly Giant Toy Superstores was a chain of large toy shops in the United Kingdom based in Glasgow. The company went into receivership in October 2002.

Store Locations

Store locations included:-
 Liverpool
 Aberdeen
 Jordanhill
 Edinburgh (Peffermill)
 Rutherglen
 Dunfermline
 Leeds
 Carlisle
 Gateshead (Team Valley)
 Rotherham
 Nottingham
 Lincoln
 Southport
 Chester
 Charlton, London
 Inverness
 Wigan
 Newcastle-under-Lyme
 Wolverhampton
 Blackpool
 Merry Hill, Dudley

References

External links
 

Retail companies established in 1980
Retail companies of the United Kingdom
Companies based in Glasgow
Retail companies of Scotland
Defunct companies of Scotland
Retail companies disestablished in 2002
Scottish brands
Defunct retail companies of the United Kingdom
Toy retailers of the United Kingdom
1980 establishments in the United Kingdom
Companies established in 1980